Sorgenfreispira africana is a species of sea snail, a marine gastropod mollusk in the family Mangeliidae.

Description
The adult shell grows to a length of 4 mm, its diameter 1.6 mm.

Distribution
This species is found in the Atlantic Ocean off Senegal and Angola.

References

 Ardovini R. (2004). Due nuove specie e una nuova sottospecie di Turridae dal Senegal, West Africa. Malacologia Mostra Mondiale 43: 7-9.
 Mariottini, P., Di Giulio, A., Smriglio, C. & Oliverio, M. (2008) Notes on the Bela brachystoma complex, with description of a new species (Mollusca, Gastropoda: Conidae). Aldrovandia 4: 3-20.
 Ardovini R. (2008) Bela africana sp. n. (Gastropoda, Turridae) West Africa, Senegal. Malacologia Mostra Mondiale 58: 12-13.

External links
  Bouchet P., Kantor Yu.I., Sysoev A. & Puillandre N. (2011) A new operational classification of the Conoidea. Journal of Molluscan Studies 77: 273-308.
  Mariottini P., Di Giulio A., Smriglio C. & Oliverio M. (2015). Additional notes on the systematics and new records of East Atlantic species of the genus Sorgenfreispira Moroni, 1979 (Gastropoda Mangeliidae). Biodiversity Journal. 6(1): 431-440
 

africana
Gastropods described in 2004